Also Eden is an English rock band that was formed in 2005, when vocalist Huw Lloyd-Jones and keyboardist/vocalist Ian Hodson, who had been working on material together up to that point, invited Simon Rogers to join them.  the band have released four studio albums and an EP, and have toured the United Kingdom and Europe since the mid-2000s, including four appearances at Summers End UK, and slots at Night Of The Prog at Loreley in Germany and The Cambridge Rock Festival (2011). Also Eden's third studio album, Think of the Children!, was released in October 2011 via F2 Records and received an 8/10 review from Geoff Barton in Classic Rock.

Musical style 
The band's sound draws influences from classic progressive rock artists such as Yes, Genesis, Marillion and Rush, as well as inspiration from the “metal, fusion, classical and classic rock genres". The band has also cited contemporary bands such as Porcupine Tree and The Flower Kings as influences.

The addition of vocalist Rich Harding in 2010 coincided with a change in overall musical style and direction for the band. Guitarist and founding member, Simon Rogers, has mentioned attempts "to impress" in the bands' early albums, with sections featuring multiple keyboard and guitar solos, whereas in later works the releases have become "more song based." The credits to the Differences As Light EP include thanks to Harding's two biggest influences, Hazel O'Connor and Billy Mackenzie, a lyric from each of whom is included in the three-part track, Reality Cheque.

History 
Ian Hodson and Huw Lloyd-Jones had played and occasionally gigged in various bands prior to the formation of Also Eden. The initial Also Eden line-up in 2005 consisted of Lloyd-Jones and Hodson, plus Simon Rogers on guitar, Ralvin Thomas on bass, and Mark "DB" Hall on drums. In 2006, the band released their debut album, About Time. The five-track album was recorded and distributed independently by the band.  Mark Hall's subsequent departure from the band saw Steve Byrne fill in for some live dates; Byrne does not feature on any recorded material with the band.

In 2008, the band released their second album, It's Kind of You to Ask. This album featured a new rhythm section: Steve Dunn on Bass and Tim Coleman on drums. Tim Coleman was later to be replaced by Dave Roelofs.

In late 2009, the band announced the departure of vocalist and founding member Huw Lloyd-Jones. Rich Harding, an acquaintance of guitarist Simon Rogers, joined as the band's new front man. Writing for what would become the band's next studio release, the 2010 EP Differences As Light, had already begun. The band chose to release the material as an EP, rather than expand it into a full album, both due to the amount of time since their last release, and to formally introduce Rich Harding as a band member.

Less than three months after the release of Differences As Light, Rich Harding was involved in a nearly-fatal motorcycle accident, resulting in injuries including an aortic rupture, multiple broken ribs, vertebral and pelvic fractures, and both legs broken, the left almost beyond repair, calling the future of the band into question. Amputation of the leg and a voice-compromising tracheotomy were considered, but ultimately averted using an Ilizarov apparatus and Distraction osteogenesis.

In Christmas 2010, a free download was made available through the band's website, featuring an original song called ‘Distortion Field’ and the seasonal ‘Bleak Mid Winter’. This was recorded while Harding was largely bed-ridden and recovering from his injuries. The former track is played in the live set, and will make a re-appearance on the next full album release.

Throughout 2011, during Harding's ongoing recovery, the band wrote and recorded material for their third studio album. The album, entitled Think of the Children!, was released in October 2011, and features the band's current drummer, Lee Nicholas. The album was released via F2 Records. In keeping with the title, the original artwork used was by Rianne Kolenbrander and Karla-Louise Davidson, Harding's former and current step-daughter, with art direction by Harding and Marcel Kolenbrander (Rianne's father), who was also responsible for all original photography used.

The band actively toured during 2011–12, with Harding having to sit on a stool during parts of the earlier gigs. After the removal of the Ilizarov Apparatus many more gigs have followed. Harding and Rogers have also played an increasing number of duo gigs under the anagrammatic moniker, Neo Deals, Harding also playing a first ever solo set at Bearded Theory Festival 2014.

Recording, mastering, mixing and production on all releases to 2011 was performed at Steep Studios by Ian Hodson, assisted by Simon Rogers and the varying Also Eden band line-up. In late 2012 the band took on freelance producer/composer, Andy Davies, who has worked for twenty years on a variety of TV and film music, including Sky One's Stella. His first public contribution was to produce the now traditional free Christmas download, Endless Silence, track two of the studio album, [REDACTED], released in November 2013 on F2 Records.  Steve Dunn's final appearance with the band was at DanFest in Leicester, in November 2012. He has been replaced by Graham Lane, whose first gig, at Gamla Christiania in Oslo, featured a guest appearance from Steve Rothery of Marillion, who joined the band to play Pink Floyd's Comfortably Numb.

In April 2013, Ian Hodson departed the Also Eden lineup.  Despite the rest of the band trying to persuade him to stay, Hodson reluctantly felt he had to go due to family and other work commitments.  He was replaced on keys' by Howard "H" Sinclair, who contributed greatly to the completion of [REDACTED], before departing in July 2014 to resume his singer-songwriter career. He was replaced by Andy Rigler, who also plays with Mr. So & So.

In early 2020, Also Eden revamped their line-up, with founding members Huw Lloyd-Jones returning as singer and Ian Hodson on keyboards. They replace singer Rich Harding, who actually replaced Lloyd-Jones in 2010, and Andy Rigler.

Also returning to the fold is bassist Graham Lane, who featured in the 2012 incarnation of the band and drummer Dave Roelofs, who had appeared with guitarist Simon Rogers, Lloyd-Jones and Hodson when Also Eden played Night Of The Prog in 2009.

The band were due to perform in Chepstow, in April 2020, but due to COVID-19, these were postponed. The band played at 'The 1865' in Southampton, in October 2021. In January 2023, they announced that Guy Monk would replace Dave Roelofs as the drummer of the band.
The band went on their 'Open Skies' tour in March and May 2023.

Line-up

Current members 
 Huw Lloyd-Jones – Vocals 
 Graham Lane – Bass Guitar, backing vocals
 Ian Hodson – Keyboards, backing vocals
 Simon Rogers – Guitar, backing vocals
 Guy Monk - Drums

Former members 
 Rich Harding – Vocals
 Ralvin Thomas – Bass
 Steve Dunn – Bass
 Tim Coleman – Drums
 Mark "DB" Hall – Drums
 Steve Byrne – Drums
 Andy Rigler – Keyboards
 Howard "H" Sinclair – Keyboards, backing vocals
 Lee Nicholas - Drums
 Dave Roelofs - Drums

Discography

Studio albums 
 About Time (2006)
 It’s Kind of You to Ask (2008)
 Think of the Children! (2011)
 [REDACTED] (2013)

EPs 
 Differences as Light (2010)

Guest and session appearances 
Rich Harding:
 Elder Water - Reinvented (TBA) - Vocals, lyrics
 Elder Water - Jump, He Said (TBA) - Vocals, lyrics
 Elder Water - What Do You Say When You Talk To Yourself (TBA) - Vocals, lyrics

Steve Dunn:
 Cosmograf - End of Ecclesia (2009) - Electric Guitar, Bass, Classical Guitar on the track “The Dark That Follows The Light” (written by Robin Armstrong/Steve Dunn)
 Cosmograf - When Age Has Done Its Duty (2011) -  Bass Guitar on the track “Blacksmith’s Hammer”
 Cosmograf - The Man Left In Space (2013) - Bass Guitar on the track “Aspire, Achieve”

Simon Rogers:
 Francis Dunnery - There's a Whole New World Out There - Guitar on the track Kiss Like Judas
 Cosmograf - When Age Has Done Its Duty (2011) - 12 String Acoustic, Electric Guitars, E Bow on the track On Which We Stand (written by Robin Armstrong/Simon Rogers)

References

External links 
 Also Eden Official Site
 Also Eden on Prog Archives
 Also Eden on Reverb Nation

British progressive rock groups
Musical groups established in 2003
English art rock groups
2003 establishments in England